Renato Mazzoncini has been appointed as CEO and Managing Director of A2A on 13 May 2020.

Biography
He was born in 1968 in Brescia, Italy. In 1992 he graduated with a Master of Science in Electrical Engineering from the Polytechnic University of Milan. He is married with three children.

Between 1995 and 2000, he was a member of a project team set up by Ansaldo Trasporti to build Copenhagen's automatic metro.

In the  mid-nineties, when Mazzoncini was 26, the apartment complex where he lived blew up due to a gas leak. Elected as spokesperson for the complex by his neighbours, he dealt with the insurance company and arranged to have the apartments demolished and rebuilt. The owner of the construction company that was tasked with the job also owned Autoguidovie, a public transport company that focused on road transport. Impressed with his management skills, he offered Mazzoncini a job as team leader. In 1998, he became Director of the same company.

While he directed Autoguidovie, the company acquired holdings in various public transport companies owned by local bodies. Among these was the public transport utility of Reggio Emilia, the mayor of which, at the time, was Graziano Delrio, the Italian Minister of Infrastructures and Transports at the time.

In 2012, Ferrovie dello Stato Italiane Spa introduced a new company called Busitalia, which aimed to expand the group's role in the public road transport sector. Mauro Moretti, at the time CEO of the group, personally asked Mazzoncini to head this new holding. He accepted, at the condition that he would be CEO and Director-general of every new company held by Busitalia. The first acquisition he made while at Busitalia was Azienda Trasporti Area Fiorentina, the public transport network operator in Florence. On the first meeting as CEO of the company, he sacked the entire executive board. While restructuring ATAF, he met Matteo Renzi, who at the time was mayor of Florence and would go on to become Prime Minister. Their partnership reportedly started with a quarrel: a raise in the prices of bus tickets prompted a very heated reaction from an infuriated Renzi, who phoned Mazzoncini while he was skiing in Northern Italy. After meeting in person, the two reportedly got along much better.

In 2014, Busitalia and Autoguidovie formed a joint venture, giving rise to the biggest local public transport player in the country.

In 2015, he became CEO of Ferrovie dello Stato Italiane Spa, replacing Moretti. He stated that Renzi and Delrio, at the time respectively Prime Minister and Minister of Infrastructures and Transports, offered him the role because both of them had previously experienced first-hand his abilities as CEO.

In 2016, Ferrovie dello Stato Italiane approved a new Industrial Plan for the 2017-2026 period, which includes 94 billion € in investments and aims to develop both the regional rail transport and freight transport sectors.

He was elected Chairman of the International Union of Railways (UIC) on December 1, 2016.

In 2017, the holding has launched a new company called Mercitalia, which aims to unify the previously fragmented position of the group in the freight transport sector.

In 2017 he has been appointed as Professor in Mobility: Infrastructure and Services at the Polytechnic University of Milan.

On 10 January 2018, the Board of Directors of Ferrovie dello Stato Italiane confirmed Renato Mazzoncini as Chief Executive Officer and Chief Operating Officer of the Group for 2018 - 2020.

On 25 July 2018, Renato Mazzoncini was removed from his roles in Ferrovie dello Stato Italiane by the Minister of Infrastructures and Transport, Danilo Toninelli.

On 13 May 2020 has become CEO and Managing Director of A2A

References

Italian chief executives
Living people
1968 births